Euphorbia aeruginosa is a succulent member of the spurge family native to South Africa. It grows as a small shrub, in sandy soils and in the fractures of rocks sending up multiple spiny blue-green photosynthetic stems.  The plant produces yellow cyathia or flowering heads.

As most other succulent members of the genus Euphorbia, its trade is regulated under Appendix II of CITES.

References

aeruginosa
Endemic flora of South Africa
aeruginosa